Elections were held in the state of Western Australia on 21 March 1959 to elect all 50 members to the Legislative Assembly. The result was a hung parliament—the two-term Labor government, led by Premier Albert Hawke, was defeated with an average swing against it of about 7 per cent, but the Liberal-Country Party coalition, led by Opposition Leader David Brand, won exactly half of the seats, and needed the support of at least one of the two Independent Liberal members to obtain a majority in the Assembly. The situation remained precarious throughout the term—while Bill Grayden joined the LCL the following year, giving the Coalition a one-seat majority, the other Independent Liberal, Edward Oldfield, joined the Labor Party.

Results

|}

 362,629 electors were enrolled to vote at the election, but 11 seats (22% of the total) were uncontested—2 Labor seats (three less than 1956) representing 16,115 enrolled voters, 5 LCL seats (the same as 1956) representing 33,484 enrolled voters, and 4 Country seats (two less than 1956) representing 20,434 enrolled voters.

See also
 Members of the Western Australian Legislative Assembly, 1956–1959
 Members of the Western Australian Legislative Assembly, 1959–1962
 Candidates of the 1959 Western Australian state election

References

Elections in Western Australia
1959 elections in Australia
1950s in Western Australia
March 1959 events in Australia